Gladiolus carinatus, commonly as the blue Afrikaner, is a perennial plant belonging to the genus Gladiolus and is part of the fynbos. The plant is native to the Western Cape.

Gallery

References 

carinatus